"Two Faces Have I" is a song written by Twyla Herbert and Lou Christie and performed by Christie in his signature falsetto. The song was produced by Nick Cenci and was featured on his 1963 album, Lou Christie. It reached #6 on the Billboard Hot 100, and #11 on the R&B chart. Outside of the US, "Two Faces Have I" peaked at #20 in Australia.

The song was ranked No. 44 on Billboards end of year ranking "Top Records of 1963". the song was recorded at Gateway Studios in Pittsburgh on February 6, 1963. Ronnie Cochrane (a local Pittsburgh based guitar player) is playing guitar on the track and a local Pittsburgh band called Johnny Wilson's Debonaires provide the song's instrumental backing along with the song's co writer (Twyla Herbert) playing piano on the track.

This song was the inspiration behind Bruce Springsteen's "Two Faces", which featured on his 1987 album Tunnel of Love.

Ol' 55 version

Australian band Ol' 55 released a version of "Two Faces Have I" as the lead single from their fourth studio album The Vault (1980). The song peaked at number 15, becoming the band's fifth top twenty single

Track listing
 7" (2079 148)
Side A	"Two Faces Have I" 
Side B "The Fool"

Charts

Weekly charts

Year-end charts

Other versions
Frank Alamo released a version in 1963 entitled "Tout Se Sait Un Jour" as part of the EP Surf!
The Thai band  released a version in 1983 under the title Nah Aai.
American rock band Garbo's Daughter covered the song on their 2010 7" single on Italy's Surfin' Ki Records.

References

1963 songs
1963 singles
1980 singles
Songs written by Twyla Herbert
Songs written by Lou Christie
Lou Christie songs
Roulette Records singles
Ol' 55 (band) songs